Honfoglalás (AKA: The Conquest) is a 1996 Hungarian film about the Magyar settlement in Hungary in approximately AD 896.

This film was written by István Nemeskürty and directed by Gábor Koltay.

Cast
Franco Nero as Árpád
Imre Sinkovits as High Prince Álmos
Tibor Bitskey as Előd
László Csendes as Tétény
László Csurka as Kond
György Dörner as Tas
Géza Kaszás as Ond
Zsolt Körtvélyessy as Huba
Zsolt Anger as Levente
Sandor Bene as young Árpád
László Sinkó as Saint Methodius
Dorka Gryllus as Hajnal
Zsuzsa Holl as Virág

See also
 list of historical drama films

External links
 

1996 films
1990s adventure drama films
Films set in the 9th century
Films set in Hungary
Drama films based on actual events
1990s Hungarian-language films
Hungarian historical drama films
1990s historical drama films
Epic films based on actual events
War adventure films
Historical epic films
1996 drama films